The Portrait of George Washington Taking the Salute at Trenton is a large full-length oil on canvas painting by the Scottish artist John Faed depicting General George Washington on the battlefield at Trenton, New Jersey, during the American Revolutionary War. The equestrian portrait was the basis for the engraving Washington Receiving a Salute on the Field of Trenton by the British artist William Holl.

History
John Faed (1819–1902) was a member of the Royal Scottish Academy. According to biographer Mary McKerrow, "Why he painted this important posthumous equestrian portrait of George Washington Taking the Salute at Trenton has still to be discovered." According to the provenance provided by Christie's, the painting originated from a commission by Andrew Carnegie. By 1982, it was in the collection of St. Mary's Art Guild in Detroit, Michigan. The painting was on display at the Westervelt–Warner Museum of American Art, renamed the Tuscaloosa Museum of Art, created by Jack Warner to display his art collection. Washington was Warner's personal hero. The art museum closed in 2018.

Description
General George Washington (1732–1799) is depicted in full military uniform, a blue coat over buff waistcoat and pants, riding on a white horse. There is a leopard-skin blanket under his saddle. He is holding a tricorner hat in his left hand and an outstretched sword in his right hand. The background shows a small group of military tents. The figure's head is based on the work of another painter, namely the Athenaeum Portrait of Washington by the American painter Gilbert Stuart (1755–1828).

Engraving

Washington Receiving a Salute on the Field of Trenton is an engraving by William Holl (1807–1871) based on Faed's equestrian portrait. In 1865, the National Art Association of New York published it exclusively for subscribers. The print was recommended for school use and seen in classrooms.

William Spohn Baker notes: 

In 1866, an advertisement in the Herald of Health for this engraving stated: 

In 1880, his portrait bust engraving was used to illustrate an article on Washington in the Magazine of American History.

Legacy
Shadows of Liberty (2016), by American contemporary painter Titus Kaphar, is a reimagined presentation of the painting.

Gallery

See also
Battle of Trenton – also known as the First Battle of Trenton
Battle of the Assunpink Creek – also known as the Second Battle of Trenton, fought one week later
Blueskin – Washington's horse represented in the painting
The Capture of the Hessians at Trenton, December 26, 1776 – the First Battle of Trenton, by John Trumbull
General George Washington at Trenton – after the Second Battle of Trenton, by John Trumbull

References

External links

1856 paintings
19th-century portraits
George Washington in art
Equestrian portraits
New Jersey in the American Revolution
Paintings about the American Revolution
Portraits of politicians